is a passenger railway station located in the city of Maibara, Shiga Prefecture, Japan, operated by the Central Japan Railway Company (JR Tōkai). It is also a freight depot for the Japan Freight Railway Company (JR Freight).

Lines

Station layout
The station consists of two island platforms connected by an underground passage. The station is staffed.

Platforms

Adjacent stations

History
The station opened on 1 July 1889, initially named . It was renamed Ōmi-Nagaoka Station on 1 December 1914. With the privatization of Japanese National Railways (JNR) on 1 April 1987, the station came under the control of JR Central.

Station numbering was introduced to the section of the Tōkaidō Line operated by JR Central in March 2018; Ōmi-Nagaoka Station was assigned station number CA81.

Passenger statistics
In fiscal 2019, the station was used by an average of 829 passengers daily (boarding passengers only).

Surrounding area
Maibara City Hall Yamahighashi Government Building
Nagaoka Genji Firefly Special Natural Monument

See also
List of railway stations in Japan

References

Yoshikawa, Fumio. Tokaido-sen 130-nen no ayumi. Grand-Prix Publishing (2002) .

External links

Railway stations in Shiga Prefecture
Tōkaidō Main Line
Stations of Central Japan Railway Company
Stations of Japan Freight Railway Company
Railway stations in Japan opened in 1889
Maibara, Shiga